Cealîc is a commune in Taraclia District, Moldova. It is composed of three villages: Cealîc, Samurza and Cortenul Nou.

References

Communes of Taraclia District